The Joseph L. Stone House is a historic house and carriage barn at 77 and 85 Temple Street in Newton, Massachusetts. The -story house, now at 77 Temple Street, has a brick first floor and wood frame upper floors, with a roughly three-part facade. On the left is a projecting section with a gabled roof, and on the right is a rounded two story tower section topped with an octagonal roof. In between is a recessed porch on the second floor, with a projecting gabled dormer above. The walls are sheathed in decorative shingle work, and the porch and porte-cochere are elaborately decorated. The carriage barn, now converted to a residence at 85 Temple, is of similar styling. The house and carriage barn were built in 1881 by Joseph L. Stone, a banker.

The buildings were listed on the National Register of Historic Places in 1986.

See also
 National Register of Historic Places listings in Newton, Massachusetts

References

Houses on the National Register of Historic Places in Newton, Massachusetts
Queen Anne architecture in Massachusetts
Houses completed in 1881
1881 establishments in Massachusetts